Sankt Florian may refer to:

People
Saint Florian (Sankt Florian), Austrian Christian saint

Places in Austria
Sankt Florian, municipality of Upper Austria
Groß Sankt Florian, municipality of Styria
Sankt Florian am Inn, municipality of Upper Austria

See also
Florian (disambiguation)